Duque de Caxias may refer to:

 Luís Alves de Lima e Silva, Duke of Caxias (1803–1880), patron of the Brazilian Army; namesake for the following:
 Duque de Caxias, Rio de Janeiro, a city in the state of Rio de Janeiro in southeastern Brazil
 Duque de Caxias (U-11), a Brazilian Navy transport ship; the former USS Orizaba
 Brazilian landing ship Duque de Caxias (G26) 
 Duque de Caxias Futebol Clube, a Brazilian football team
 Esporte Clube Tigres do Brasil of Duque de Caxias
 Duque de Caxias, Santa Maria
 CEPE-Caxias